This is a list of Ancestral Puebloan dwellings in Arizona.

Locations

See also 
 History of Arizona

References 

Arizona

Puebloan